General elections were held in the Netherlands on 17 May 1946, the first after World War II. The Catholic People's Party, a continuation of the pre-war Roman Catholic State Party, remained the largest party in the House of Representatives, winning 32 of the 100 seats.

Following the elections, the Catholic People's Party formed a grand coalition government with the Labour Party.

Results
Indicated changes in seats are compared to the Schermerhorn-Drees cabinet appointed by Queen Wilhelmina after World War II.

References

General elections in the Netherlands
1946 elections in the Netherlands
Netherlands
May 1946 events in Europe